The 2015 Taiwanese legislative by-elections were held on 7 February 2015 in Taiwan to elect 5 of the 113 members of the Legislative Yuan for the remaining term until 2016. No change in the party composition of the Legislative Yuan resulted from the by-elections; three Democratic Progressive Party candidates won the seats vacated by DPP legislators, and two Kuomintang candidates won the seats vacated by KMT legislators.

Background
The by-election was the result of resignations by Kuomintang legislator Hsu Yao-chang from Miaoli County's 2nd district; Lin Chia-lung, Democratic Progressive Party legislator for Taichung City's 6th district; Wei Ming-ku, Democratic Progressive Party legislator for Changhua County's 4th district; Lin Ming-chen, Kuomintang legislator for Nantou County's 2nd district; and Pan Men-an, Democratic Progressive Party legislator for Pingtung County's 3rd district.

Hsu Yao-chang, Wei Ming-ku, Lin Ming-chen, and Pan Men-an won their elections for county magistrate, and Lin Chia-lung won his election for mayor in the 2014 local election.

On 5 December 2014, the Central Election Commission announced that by-elections for Taichung 6 and Changhua 4 were to be held on 7 February 2015. Candidate registrations for the two seats were open from 22 to 26 December 2014. On 26 December 2014, the CEC announced that the by-elections for Miaoli 2, Nantou 2, and Pingtung 3 were to be held on 7 February 2015 as well. Candidate registrations for these three seats were open from 26 December 2014 to 9 January 2015.

Candidates by main parties

Miaoli 2
 called in head of Gongguan Township  to contest the seat.
 called in legislator Wu Yi-chen to contest the seat. The DPP originally supported Sunflower Student Movement activist 's bid, but Chen dropped out after allegations of sexual harassment against him surfaced online.

Taichung 6
 called in Deputy Secretary-General of the Executive Yuan Hsiao Chia-chi to contest the seat.
 called in Taichung City councillor Huang Kuo-shu to contest the seat.

Changhua 4
 called in former Changhua County magistrate Cho Po-yuan to contest the seat.
 called in Changhua County councillor Chen Su-yueh to contest the seat.

Nantou 2
 called in Nantou City mayor Hsu Shu-hua to contest the seat.
 called in former legislator Tang Huo-shen to contest the seat. Former legislator Chen Cheng-sheng of the  had previously announced his intention to run, but Chen dropped out and supported Tang as the opposition candidate.

Pingtung 3
's nomination shortlist included legislator Su Ching-chuan, former legislator , and Director-General of the Pingtung County Farmer Association Huang Jui-chi. The KMT ultimately called in Liao to contest the seat.
 called in former Taipei City councillor Liao Wan-ju to contest the seat. Former Executive Yuan advisor  had also expressed interest in running, but the DPP nominated Liao after comparing results from hypothetical head-to-head polling.

Opinion Polls

Miaoli 2

Taichung 6

Changhua 4

Nantou 2

Pingtung 3

Results

Miaoli 2
Voted on 7 February 2015.

Taichung 6
Voted on 7 February 2015.

Changhua 4
Voted on 7 February 2015.

Nantou 2
Voted on 7 February 2015.

Pingtung 3
Voted on 7 February 2015.

Notes

References 

By-elections
By-elections in Taiwan
February 2015 events in Asia